Sir Walter Butler, 11th Earl of Ormond and 4th Earl of Ossory (1559–1633), succeeded his uncle the 10th earl, in 1614. He was called "Walter of the Beads" because he was a devout Catholic, whereas his uncle had been a Protestant. King James I intervened and awarded half of the inheritance to his uncle's Protestant daughter Elizabeth. Ormond contested the King's decision and was for that detained in the Fleet Prison from 1619 until 1625 when he submitted to the King's ruling. He then found a means to reunite the Ormond estate, by marrying his grandson James, who had been raised a Protestant, to Elizabeth's only daughter.

Birth and origins 

{{Tree chart| | | | | | |PrsO8|y|MgtFG|boxstyle=border-width: 1px; border-radius: 0.5em;
 |PrsO8=Piers8th EarlOrmond|boxstyle_PrsO8=border-width: 1px; border-radius: 0.5em; background: lavender;
 |MgtFG=[[Margaret FitzGerald, Countess of Ormond|'MargaretFitzGerald]]}}

Walter was born in 1559, the second son of John Butler of Kilcash and his wife Katherine MacCarthy. His father was a younger son of James Butler, 9th Earl of Ormond. His father's family, the Butler Dynasty, was Old English and descended from Theobald Walter, who had been appointed chief butler of Ireland by King Henry II in 1177.

Walter's mother was a daughter of Cormac na Haoine MacCarthy Reagh. Her father was the 13th prince of Carbery. Her family was Gaelic Irish. Walter's parents were both Catholic. Walter was one of four siblings, who are listed in his father's article.

 Early life 
Butler was brought up as a devout Catholic and was known as "Walter of the Beads" (Irish: "Váitéar an Phaidrín"'').

His father, John of Kilcash, died on 10 May 1570 when Walter was about eleven.
 His brother James inherited but died unmarried sometime before September 1576 when Walter became the owner of the land around Kilcash Castle that had been his father's appanage.

Butler worked closely with his uncle, the Earl of Ormond. As a reward for his military service with the earl, he was knighted by Adam Loftus and Robert Gardiner in 1598.

Marriage and children 
About 1584 Butler married a second cousin, Helen Butler (also known as Ellen), eldest daughter of Edmund Butler, 2nd Viscount Mountgarret and his wife Grizel FitzPatrick. Their common great-grandfather was Piers Butler, 8th Earl of Ormond.

 
Walter and Helen had two sons:
 Thomas Butler, Viscount Thurles (1594–1619), married Elizabeth, daughter of Sir John Pointz, and had issue, including James Butler, 1st Duke of Ormond
 James, died young in France

—and nine daughters:
 Margaret, married Barnaby Fitzpatrick, 5th Baron Upper Ossory
 Catherine, married Piers Power of Monalargie, 2nd son of Richard Power, 2nd Baron Power of Curraghmore
 Ellen (died 1663), married Pierce Butler, 1st Viscount Ikerrin
 Helena, married James Butler of Grellagh, 5th son of James Butler, 2nd Baron Dunboyne
 Joan, married 1st George Bagenal, 2ndly Theobald Purcell, and 3rdly Sir Thomas Esmond, 1st Baronet.
 Mary, married George Hamilton of Greenlaw and Roscrea
 Elizabeth, married 1st Sir Edmond Blanchville and 2ndly Richard Burke, 6th Earl of Clanricarde
 Eleanor (died 1633), died unmarried
 Ellis Butler (died 1625), who married Sir Terence O'Brien-Arragh, 1st Baronet of Arragh

Member of parliament 
In 1613 the only Irish parliament of the reign of James I was called. On 13 April 1613 Butler was returned as member of the Irish House of Commons for Tipperary County. He was part of the resistance to government attempts to introduce anti-Catholic legislation.

11th Earl 
His uncle, the 10th Earl died on 22 November 1614 leaving an only daughter, Elizabeth, who had married Richard Preston, 1st Earl of Desmond. Butler, his nephew, succeeded as the 11th Earl of Ormond and expected to also inherit the estates, but his claim to the family estates was challenged by Richard Preston, the husband of the 10th Earl's only child. The dispute was arbitrated by King James I, who awarded most of the estate, including Kilkenny Castle, to Preston. Ormond spent much time and money in litigation in opposing the King's decision. His persistence resulted in him being committed to the Fleet prison in 1617. He remained incarcerated for eight years in great want with no rents reaching him from his estate. James meanwhile challenged his ownership of the county palatine of Tipperary with a writ of quo warranto (by what right?). This county had been vested in the head of the family for nearly four hundred years and could therefore under no circumstance have belonged to his cousin Elizabeth, the wife of Richard Preston. No answer was made to the writ, if indeed an opportunity was afforded for an answer, and James took the county palatine into his own hands.

Ormond was freed in 1625 and large parts of his estates were restored to him. For some while he lived in a house in Drury Lane, London, with his grandson James, afterwards Duke of Ormond. In 1629, on the projected marriage of his grandson with Elizabeth Preston, Preston's only child, Charles I of England granted her marriage and the wardship of her lands to him by letters patent dated 8 September. After the marriage he was recognised, on 9 October 1630, as heir to the lands of his uncle, Earl Thomas, as well as of Sir John Butler of Kilcash, his father.

Ormond also suffered problems within his own family. His son Thomas, styled viscount Thurles, married the daughter of Sir John Poyntz of Gloucestershire against Walter's wish. Years later Thomas was accidentally drowned at The Skerries, Isle of Anglesey at the beginning of Walter's long imprisonment in the Fleet Prison. Viscount Thurles was a prominent Catholic and at the time of his death, was being sent to England on charges of having garrisoned Kilkenny.

Death and timeline 
Ormond died at Carrick-on-Suir on 24 February 1633 and was buried in St. Canice's Cathedral, Kilkenny, on 18 June 1633. His eldest son having predeceased him, he was succeeded by his grandson, James Butler, later the 1st Duke of Ormond.

Notes and references

Notes

Citations

Sources 

 
 
 
 
  – N to R (for Ormond)
  – Scotland and Ireland
 
 
  — Google Books no preview
  – Contains "The Unkinde Desertor of Loyall Men and True Frinds"
  – (for timeline)
 
 
  – Viscounts (for Butler, Viscount Mountgarrett)
  – Knights bachelors & Index

Ormonde, Walter Butler, 11th Earl of
Ormonde, Walter Butler, 11th Earl of
16th-century Anglo-Irish people
17th-century Anglo-Irish people
Walter
Earls of Ormond (Ireland)
Inmates of Fleet Prison
Irish expatriates in Austria-Hungary
Irish MPs 1613–1615
Irish people of the Thirty Years' War
Members of the Parliament of Ireland (pre-1801) for County Tipperary constituencies